The Roman Catholic Diocese of Lugazi is a diocese located in the city of Lugazi in the ecclesiastical province of Kampala in Uganda.

History
 November 30, 1996: Established as Diocese of Lugazi from the Metropolitan Archdiocese of Kampala.

Current bishop
The Right Reverend Christopher Kakooza was born at Nsambya Hospital on 15 November 1952. His parents lived at Lusaze, Kyaddondo County, in the Archdiocese of Kampala. He was ordained priest on 3 June 1983 at St Mbaaga's Major Seminary, Ggaba, as one of the pioneer group of the seminary and appointed auxiliary bishop on 30 January 1999. His episcopal ordination took place on 17 April 1999 at Rubaga Cathedral. He was appointed as the bishop of the Roman Catholic Diocese of Lugazi, on 4 November 2014, by Pope Francis, replacing Bishop Matthias Ssekamanya, who retired. He was consecrated as bishop of the Diocese of Lugazi on Saturday 3 January 2015, by Cyprian Kizito Lwanga, the Archbishop of Kampala.

Leadership

 Bishops of Lugazi (Roman rite)
 Bishop  Matthias Ssekamanya (23 February 1997 – 3 January 2015)
 Bishop Christopher Kakooza (since 3 January 2015)

See also
Roman Catholicism in Uganda
Lugazi
Mount Saint Mary's College Namagunga

References

External links
 GCatholic.org
 Catholic Hierarchy
Lugazi Diocese Homepage

Sources
Catholic-hierarchy

Roman Catholic dioceses in Uganda
Christian organizations established in 1996
Roman Catholic dioceses and prelatures established in the 20th century
Mukono District
Roman Catholic Ecclesiastical Province of Kampala